Om Prakash Gurjar is an Indian children's rights activist and recipient of the 2006 International Children's Peace Prize. He was born in Rajasthan, India and was a victim of illegal child labor. He is known for his fight to keep public schools in India free and advocating for birth certificate registration for children to protect their rights. In addition, he and two friends founded the organization, Paatshala, which facilitates evening classes in reading, writing, and math for children.

https://www.kidsrights.org/advocacy/international-childrens-peace-prize/winners/om-prakash-gurjar/

External links 
 Bio details, The Children's Peace Prize
 Victory at last: Child 'slave' gets peace prize, The Times of India, 21 November 2006
 On a mission against bondage, The Hindu, 23 November 2006

1992 births
Living people
Child activists
Indian children's rights activists
Child labour in India
Activists from Rajasthan